Sophie is the fifth studio album by the heavy metal band BulletBoys. The album was released October 24, 2003, and was produced by Andy Johns. The album was self-released by the band through their own label, Bulletboys Records.

Track listing

Personnel
Marq Torien - vocals
Jason Hook - guitar
 Lonnie Vencent - bass
 Pete Newman - drums

References

2003 albums
BulletBoys albums
Albums produced by Andy Johns